Mayall v Ward [1982] 2 NZLR 385 is a cited case regarding relief under the Contractual Remedies Act 1979.

References

New Zealand contract case law